Artsni is a village located in the Lori Province of Armenia.

History 
Since May 1989, after the outbreak of the Nagorno-Karabakh conflict, the village of Artsni has been inhabited with Armenian refugees from Azerbaijan and Karabakh, mainly from Getashen. The village had a former Azerbaijani population.

References

External links 

Populated places in Lori Province